Lisa Grunwald Adler (born 1959) is an American author.

Biography 
She is the author of six novels and one children's book.   With her husband, former Reuters Editor-in-Chief Stephen J. Adler, she has edited three anthologies: The Marriage Book (Simon & Schuster), Letters of the Century (The Dial Press), and Women's Letters  (The Dial Press). Grunwald has been an editor and writer at the magazines Esquire, Avenue, and Life, and has freelanced for others.

Grunwald and Adler have two children, and live in New York City. She is the daughter of the late Beverly Suser and Henry Grunwald, the magazine editor. She grew up in Manhattan, where she graduated from the Nightingale-Bamford School and then from Harvard College. Her sister is Mandy Grunwald, a political consultant, and her brother is Peter Grunwald, a movie producer.

Books
 Time After Time, Random House (2019)
 The Marriage Book, Simon & Schuster (2015) 
 The Irresistible Henry House, Random House (2010)
Whatever Makes You Happy, Random House (2005)
Women's Letters, Dial Press (2005)
Letters of the Century, America: 1900-1999, Dial Press (1999) (ed., with Stephen J Adler)
Now, Soon, Later, for children, Morrow (1996)
New Year's Eve, Crown (1996)
The Theory of Everything, Knopf (1991)
Summer, Knopf (1985)

References

1959 births
Living people
20th-century American novelists
21st-century American novelists
American book editors
American children's writers
American people of Austrian-Jewish descent
American women novelists
American women journalists
American women children's writers
Jewish American novelists
Jewish women writers
21st-century American women writers
20th-century American women writers
Harvard College alumni
20th-century American journalists
21st-century American non-fiction writers
Nightingale-Bamford School alumni
21st-century American Jews